Kavisha Dilhari (born 24 January 2001) is a Sri Lankan cricketer. She made her Women's One Day International cricket (WODI) debut for Sri Lanka Women against Pakistan Women on 20 March 2018. She has played domestic cricket since the age of fifteen.

In September 2018, she was named in Sri Lanka's Women's Twenty20 International (WT20I) squad for the series against India. She made her WT20I debut for Sri Lanka against India Women on 19 September 2018.

In October 2018, she was named in Sri Lanka's squad for the 2018 ICC Women's World Twenty20 tournament in the West Indies. In November 2019, she was named as the vice-captain of Sri Lanka's squad for the women's cricket tournament at the 2019 South Asian Games. The Sri Lankan team won the silver medal, after losing to Bangladesh by two runs in the final. In January 2020, she was named in Sri Lanka's squad for the 2020 ICC Women's T20 World Cup in Australia. In October 2021, she was named in Sri Lanka's team for the 2021 Women's Cricket World Cup Qualifier tournament in Zimbabwe. In January 2022, she was named in Sri Lanka's team for the 2022 Commonwealth Games Cricket Qualifier tournament in Malaysia. In July 2022, she was named in Sri Lanka's team for the cricket tournament at the 2022 Commonwealth Games in Birmingham, England.

References

External links

 

2001 births
Living people
Sri Lankan women cricketers
Sri Lanka women One Day International cricketers
Sri Lanka women Twenty20 International cricketers
People from Galle District
South Asian Games silver medalists for Sri Lanka
South Asian Games medalists in cricket
Cricketers at the 2022 Commonwealth Games
Commonwealth Games competitors for Sri Lanka